Amen-Ra Mackey (born September 27, 1992), better known by the ring name A. C. Mack, is an American professional wrestler.

Professional wrestling career 
He began to train with A.R. Fox and debuted in 2016. He worked for independent promotions in the South of the United States. As part of ACTION Wrestling, he became the ACTION Champion, a title he held for a record of 798 days. In 2018, he worked in a squash match for the WWE development territory, WWE NXT, losing against Dominik Dijakovic. On January 21, 2022, Mack defeated Alex Shelley to win the Independent Wrestling World Championship. With his title win, he became the first male openly gay world champion.

Professional wrestling style and persona 
Mack uses a crossed-armed Pedigree as a finisher called Mack 10.

Championship and accomplishments 
ACTION Wrestling
ACTION Championship (1 time)
Anarchy Wrestling 
Anarchy Television Championship (1 time)
Indepdendent Wrestling TV
Independent Wrestling World Championship (1 time)
Intense Wrestling Entertainment 
IWE Mayhem Championship (1 time)
Peachstate Wrestling Alliance 
PWA No Limits Championship (3 times)
Pro Wrestling Illustrated
Ranked No. 25 of the top 500 singles wrestlers in the PWI 500 in 2022
Scenic City Invitational
 Scenic City Invitational tournament (2021)
Southern Honor Wrestling 
SHW Championship (1 time)
Southern Underground Pro
SUP Bonestorm Championship (1 time)

References

External links 
 
 

1992 births
American male professional wrestlers
African-American male professional wrestlers
Gay sportsmen
LGBT professional wrestlers
Living people
People from Atlanta
Professional wrestlers from Georgia (U.S. state)